Zsófia Kónya (born 6 February 1995 in Szeged, Hungary) is a Hungarian short track speed skater, member of the national team. She was 3rd place on the European Championships in 2014 and 3rd placed in the Winter Universiade in 2013. She qualified and was expected to compete in Sochi at the Winter Olympic Games in 2014, representing Hungary.

Personal life 
She was born in Szeged, Hungary. She lived in the city until she was 16. She began skating sports at the age of 7. She took up short track speed skating at the age of 8. She decided to compete in short track because of the possibility of participating at the Olympic Games.
In 2011 she moved to Budapest because of the better training facilities. Meanwhile, she also switched clubs; she became the skater of Sportország SC. By this time, she was already a member of the national team.

Sports career 
She won Hungarian Junior Championships 6 times. She also celebrated winning the European Junior Cup twice, finishing second twice at the competition.

She finished on the podium in 2009 at the Hungarian Championships for the first time. She achieved two bronzes at this event in 1500 and in 3000 meters. In 2011 she finished third overall while winning a gold medal with the relay team.

Her best result at the Junior World Championships is 8th place. In Melbourne (2012), she took this position in the 500 meters. One year later, in Warsaw, she achieved the 8th position in 1500 meters, while she took 11th place overall.
Since season 2011/12, she has been competing at the World Cup events. Her best position until now is 15th place in Nagoya (2012).

2013 was a big success thanks to the relay bronze gained in the Winter Universiade in Trentino, Italy. She also achieved the 8th position on 1000 meters.

The year's main events were the two qualification World Cups for the Olympic Games. She was able to win a quota for her country in 1500 meters. She also helped the women's relay team to qualify for Sochi according to the results of the World Cups held in Torino, Italy and in Kolomna, Russia.

Her best result so far is the two bronze medals gained at the European Championships (Dresden, 2014): individual in 1500 m. and a team relay race on 3000 meters. In the overall classification, she took 6th place.

Best times

Results

References

External links  
 Profile on shorttrackonline.info
 

1995 births
Living people
Hungarian female short track speed skaters
Olympic short track speed skaters of Hungary
Short track speed skaters at the 2014 Winter Olympics
Short track speed skaters at the 2018 Winter Olympics
Short track speed skaters at the 2022 Winter Olympics
Olympic bronze medalists for Hungary
Medalists at the 2022 Winter Olympics
Olympic medalists in short track speed skating
Sportspeople from Szeged
Universiade bronze medalists for Hungary
Universiade medalists in short track speed skating
Competitors at the 2013 Winter Universiade
21st-century Hungarian women